The Pensacola Open was a golf tournament on the PGA Tour. The inaugural version of the tournament was played in 1956 and its last edition in 1988.

Tournament highlights
 1960: Arnold Palmer birdies the 72nd hole to win by one shot over Doug Sanders. It is Palmer's third consecutive win in as many weeks. 
 1966: Defending champion Doug Sanders is ahead by four shots after 36 holes when he is disqualified for not signing his scorecard. 
 1967: Gay Brewer successfully defends his Pensacola Open. He shoots a then record 191 for 54 holes and wins by six shots over local pro Bob Keller.   
 1968: George Archer birdies the last three holes on Sunday on his way to a 65 and a one-shot win over Dave Marr and Tony Jacklin. 
 1972: Dave Hill wins for the first time in two years. He birdies the 72nd hole to beat Jerry Heard by one shot.
 1974: Lee Elder birdies the 4th hole of a sudden death playoff to defeat Peter Oosterhuis and win for the first time ever on the PGA Tour. With the win, Elder becomes the first black golfer to qualify for the Masters Tournament.
 1979: Future two-time U.S. Open champion Curtis Strange wins for the first time on the PGA Tour. He beats Billy Kratzert by one shot.
 1981: Pensacola resident Jerry Pate wins by three shots over Steve Melnyk.
 1982: Calvin Peete wins by seven shots over Hal Sutton and Dan Halldorson. It is Peete's 4th PGA Tour win for the year tying him for the most with Craig Stadler.
 1986: As rain shortens the Pensacola Open to only 36 holes, Ernie Gonzalez becomes the first left-handed golfer to win on the PGA Tour since Bob Charles won the 1974 Greater Greensboro Open.
 1988: Andrew Magee wins the last Pensacola Open. He beats Bruce Lietzke, Ken Green, and Tom Byrum by one shot.

Tournament hosts
This list is incomplete.
1988 Tiger Point Golf & Country Club in Gulf Breeze, Florida
1978–1987 Perdido Bay Country Club in Pensacola, Florida
1958–1977 Pensacola Country Club in Pensacola, Florida

Winners

Notes

References

External links
Tournament results (1970-1988) at GolfObserver.com

Former PGA Tour events
Golf in Florida
Sports in Pensacola, Florida
Recurring sporting events established in 1956
Recurring sporting events disestablished in 1988
1956 establishments in Florida
1988 disestablishments in Florida